Tun Tun (11 July 1923 – 24 November 2003) was the screen name of Indian playback singer and actress-comedienne, Uma Devi Khatri, who was called "Hindi cinema's first-ever comedienne".

Childhood

Uma was born in a small village near Amroha District of present-day Uttar Pradesh, India in 1923. Her parents and brother were murdered for land arrogate. Just before two days of her demise she had been interviewed by film critic and historian Shishir Krishn Sharma. She said : "I don't remember who my parents were and how they looked, I would be two to two and half years when they passed away, I had a brother eight or nine years old whose name was Hari, I just remembered that we were living in a village named Alipur. One day brother was killed and left for maid servant to relatives in exchange for two times meal, that time I was four or five years old".

Uma Devi's childhood was marked by poverty. She later met Akhtar Abbas Kazi, an Excise Duty Inspector, who helped and inspired her. At the time of the India-Pakistan partition, Kazi moved to Lahore, Pakistan. She was fed up with the circumstances of the time and she moved to Bombay to pursue singing in movies. Kazi also eventually moved to Bombay, where they got married in 1947.

Career
She arrived in Bombay (Mumbai) at the age of 23, having run away from home, and knocked on composer Naushad Ali's door. She told him that she could sing and that she would throw herself in the ocean if he didn't give her a chance. He auditioned her, and hired her on the spot.  She made her debut as a solo playback singer in Nazir's Wamiq Azra (1946). She soon signed a contract with the producer-director A.R. Kardar, who used Naushad as music director, and went on to make a place for herself amidst music stalwarts like Noor Jehan, Rajkumari, Khursheed Bano and Zohrabai Ambalewali.

In 1947, she had huge hits with "Afsana Likh Rahi Hoon Dil-e-Beqarar Ka", "Yeh Kaun Chala Meri Aankhon Mein Sama Kar" and "Aaj Machi Hai Dhoom Jhoom Khushi Se Jhoom", which she sang for actress Munawar Sultana in A.R. Kardar's Dard (1947), again under the music direction of Naushad, she also sang a duet; "Betaab Hai Dil Dard-e-Mohabat Ke Asar Se", with Suraiya. In fact, a gentleman from Delhi was so enamoured by her song "Afsana Likh Rahi Hoon", that he stayed with her in Bombay. They got married, and the couple had two daughters and two sons; her husband, whom she called Mohan, died in 1992.

The success of Dard meant that she next received Mehboob Khan's Anokhi Ada (1948), which again had two hit numbers, "Kahe Jiya Dole" and "Dil Ko Lagake Humne Kuch Bhi Na Paya". This brought her into the league of highly rated playback singers. She reached her peak as a vocalist in director S.S. Vasan's Chandralekha (1948) made by Gemini Studios, Madras. Her seven songs, which include hits such as "Saanjh Ki Bela" remain her most accomplished work in her singing career, though signing for the film also meant a breach of contract with producer-director Kardar, which led to her dwindling fortunes in the industry.

Moreover, in the following years, owing to her older style of singing and limited vocal range, she found it difficult to compete with the rising singing stars Lata Mangeshkar and Asha Bhosle. Eventually Naushad suggested that she take up acting, because she had a very bubbly personality and wonderful comic timing. She was inspired and awestruck by Dilip Kumar and had a wish, maintaining it stubbornly that in her first film, she would act alongside him. Knowing about this crazy love for Dilip Kumar, Naushad asked Dilip Kumar, who was his friend, to cast her in one of his films, and she appeared in Babul (1950) with him, which had Nargis as the lead actress; it is he who renamed her "Tun Tun" to suit her comic persona, the name stayed with her, and a comedic legend was born.

She went on to act in Guru Dutt's classics such as Aar Paar (1954), Mr. & Mrs. '55 (1955) and Pyaasa (1957). In the 1960s and 1970s, she was a permanent comic relief in numerous Bollywood films; a few years down the line, she most notably starred with Amitabh Bachchan in Namak Halaal (1982), a Prakash Mehra blockbuster.

In her career spanning five decades, she acted in about 198 films in Hindi/Urdu and other languages like Punjabi etc., pairing with top comedy actors of her times such as Bhagwan Dada, Agha, Sunder, Mukri, Dhumal, Johnny Walker and Keshto Mukherjee. She was last seen in Hindi films in Kasam Dhande Ki (1990).

Owing to her popularity, the name Tun Tun has become synonymous with fat women in India.

Death
She died on 23 November 2003 in Andheri, Mumbai, after a prolonged illness at the age of 80 and is survived by her four children and four grandchildren.

Filmography

As a Singer
Jio Raja  (1949)

References

External links
 
 
 List of Songs under music director, Naushad

Indian film actresses
20th-century Indian actresses
1923 births
2003 deaths
Actresses from Uttar Pradesh
Indian women playback singers
Actresses from Mumbai
Place of birth missing
Actresses in Hindi cinema
Bollywood playback singers
Indian women comedians
Punjabi people
20th-century Indian singers
Singers from Mumbai
Women musicians from Maharashtra
Women musicians from Uttar Pradesh
Singers from Uttar Pradesh
20th-century Indian women singers
20th-century comedians